Steve Amick (born 1964) is an American novelist and short story writer.

Career
Steve Amick holds a BA in English-writing from St. Lawrence University and an MFA in creative writing from George Mason University.

Amick's novels The Lake, the River & the Other Lake and Nothing But a Smile were published by Pantheon Books. His short story appearances include Zoetrope: All-Story, Playboy, The Southern Review, Michigan Quarterly Review, McSweeney’s, in the anthology The Sound of Writing, and on National Public Radio.

Amick teaches at the Pacific University Low-Residency MFA creative writing program.

Works

Novels
The Lake, the River & the Other Lake (2005)
Nothing But a Smile (2009)

Anthologies
Kwame Dawes, ed. When the Rewards Can Be So Great: Essays on Writing and the Writing Life. Pacific University Press. (2016)
Keith Taylor and Laura Kasischke, eds. Ghost Writers: Contemporary Ghost Stories from Michigan. Wayne State University Press. (2011)
Robert Shapard and James Thomas, eds. New Sudden Fiction: Short-Short Stories From America and Beyond. W. W. Norton & Company. (2007)
Kathryn Harrison and Jeff Kass, eds. Unsquared: Ann Arbor’s Writers Unleash Their Edgiest Stories and Poems. 826michigan. (2006)
Alan Cheuse, ed. The Sound of Writing. Anchor/Doubleday. (1991)

Awards
Michigan Notable Book Award (2006 & 2010)
Washington Post Book of the Year (2005)
Michigan Quarterly Review's Lawrence Prize (2011)
Dan Rudy Prize, George Mason University (1989)

References

External links
Official website
"The Peninsula Personality: An interview with Steve Amick," Michigan Radio
"Interview: Nerdy Questions for Author Steve Amick--Part One," Pop Culture Nerd
Personal Essay: "Cold Comfort," The New York Times

American romantic fiction novelists
American horror writers
Novelists from Michigan
American male novelists
American male short story writers
21st-century American novelists
21st-century American short story writers
1964 births
Living people
St. Lawrence University alumni
George Mason University alumni
21st-century American male writers